Sandy Burke of the U-Bar-U is a 1919 American silent Western film directed by Ira M. Lowry and starring Louis Bennison, Virginia Lee, Alphonse Ethier, H.H. Pattee, Echlin Gayer, and Lucy Beaumont. The film was released by Goldwyn Pictures on February 23, 1919.

Plot

Cast
 Louis Bennison as Sandy Burke
 Virginia Lee as Molly Kirby
 Alphonse Ethier as Jim Diggs
 H.H. Pattee as Jeff Kirby
 Echlin Gayer as Honorable Cyril Harcourt Stammers
 Lucy Beaumont as Widow Mackey
 Wilson Bayley as Sheriff Quinlan
 Nadia Gary as Dolly Morgan
 Phil Sanford as Lafe Hinton (as Philip Sanford)
 Robert Narin (uncredited)

Preservation
A print of Sandy Burke of the U-Bar-U survives at the Library of Congress.

References

External links
 

1919 films
1919 Western (genre) films
American black-and-white films
Goldwyn Pictures films
Silent American Western (genre) films
1910s American films
1910s English-language films